Rosbach vor der Höhe is a town in Hesse, Germany.

Rosbach may also refer to:

Places
 Rosbach vor der Höhe station, a railway station at Rosbach vor der Höhe
 Rosbach, part of the municipality of Windeck in Northrhine-Westphalia, Germany
 Rosbach station, a railway station at Rosbach (Windeck)
 Rosbach (Nidda), a river in Hesse, Germany

People
 Anna Rosbach (born 1947), Danish politician
 Johan Hammond Rosbach (1921–2004), Norwegian author
 Wilma Rosbach (1921–2018), American politician

See also 
 Rossbach (disambiguation), or Roßbach
 Rosbash